Kathleen Hays is a university-trained economist with experience at the Federal Reserve and who is now an on-air financial reporter for Bloomberg Television.  She was formerly a reporter for Investor's Business Daily, CNBC's Squawk Box and various CNNfn programming before joining Bloomberg.

Education
She is fluent in English and Spanish. She holds both a bachelor's degree and a master's degree in Economics from Stanford University.

References

21st-century American economists
American women economists
Stanford University alumni
Living people
Bloomberg L.P. people
CNBC people
Year of birth missing (living people)
21st-century American women